"Honoria Glossop Turns Up" is the third episode of the fourth series of the 1990s British comedy television series Jeeves and Wooster. It is also called "Bridegroom Wanted".

In the US, it was aired as the second episode of the third series of Jeeves and Wooster on Masterpiece Theatre, on 17 October 1993. "Wooster with a Wife" aired as the third episode of the fourth series instead.

Background 
Adapted from "Jeeves and the Greasy Bird" (collected in Plum Pie) and "Bingo and the Little Woman" (collected in The Inimitable Jeeves), all written by P. G. Wodehouse. The title was written for television by Clive Exton.

Cast
 Bertie Wooster – Hugh Laurie
 Jeeves – Stephen Fry
 Bingo Little – Pip Torrens
 Sir Roderick Glossop – Philip Locke
 Honoria Glossop – Liz Kettle
 Rosie M. Banks – Anastasia Hille
 Lord Bittlesham – Geoffrey Toone
 Jas Waterbury – David Healy
 Liftman Coneybear – Joseph Mydell

Plot

Bingo Little wants to marry a waitress so needs his uncle's blessing. Bertie is pushed into helping him by pretending to be author Rosie M. Banks again. Little's uncle, Lord Bittlesham, is under Sir Roderick Glossop who has moved to America. Trying to sort things out, Bertie manages to get Blair Eggleston to break off his engagement with Honoria Glossop who now wants to marry Bertie. Meanwhile Bingo marries the waitress, who turns out to be the real Rosie M. Banks, so she and Lord Bittlesham are also after Bertie who decides the best thing is to take the next ship to London. But so do all the others and, confronted by all of them on board, he and Jeeves jump ship. Eight and a half months later, they turn up back in England, with long beards and looking like they have spent much of that time in an open boat and in savage lands.

See also
 List of Jeeves and Wooster characters

References

External links
 

Jeeves and Wooster episodes
1993 British television episodes
Television episodes set in New York City